The 2022 Scheldeprijs was the 110th edition of the Scheldeprijs road cycling one day race, which was held on 6 April 2022. It was a 1.Pro event on the 2022 UCI ProSeries.

The Scheldeprijs is known as a race that particularly suits the sprinters as it includes several cobbled roads but no significant climbs. Danny van Poppel outsprinted Sam Welsford for second, finishing 24 seconds behind Kristoff.

Teams 
Nine of the eighteen UCI WorldTeams, nine UCI ProTeams, and three UCI Continental teams made up the twenty-one teams that participated in the race. Only 30 riders finished the race.

UCI WorldTeams

 
 
 
 
 
 
 
 
 

UCI ProTeams

 
 
 
 
 
 
 
 
 

UCI Continental Teams

Result

References 

2022
Scheldeprijs
Scheldeprijs
Scheldeprijs
Scheldeprijs
Scheldeprijs
Scheldeprijs